Michael McBride is a lightweight fighter from United States.

Mixed martial arts career

Ultimate Fighting Championship

McBride made his UFC debut as a replacement for Mairbek Taisumov against Nik Lentz on September 10, 2016 at UFC 203.  He lost the fight via TKO in the first round.

McBride next faced Scott Holtzman on April 22, 2017 at UFC Fight Night 108. He lost the fight via unanimous decision.

Mixed martial arts record

|-
|Loss
|align=center|8–3
|Scott Holtzman
|Decision (unanimous)
|UFC Fight Night: Swanson vs. Lobov
|
|align=center|3
|align=center|5:00
|Nashville, Tennessee, United States
|
|-
|Loss
|align=center| 8–2
|Nik Lentz
|TKO (punches)
|UFC 203
|
|align=center|2
|align=center|4:17
|Cleveland, Ohio, United States
|
|-
|Win
|align=center| 8–1
| Derek Loffer
|Submission (triangle choke)
| MCC 61: Thanksgiving Throwdown
| 
|align=center|2
|align=center|1:54
| Des Moines, Iowa, United States
|
|-
|Win
|align=center| 7–1
| Kevin Morris
|Submission (rear-naked choke)
|Bellator 129
|
|align=center|1
|align=center|4:32
|Council Bluffs, Iowa, United States
|
|-
|Win
|align=center| 6–1
|Paul Hunhoff
|Submission (kimura)
|Midwest Cage Championship 55
|
|align=center|1
|align=center|3:08
|Des Moines, Iowa, United States
|
|-
|Win
|align=center|5-1
|Micah Washington
|Submission (brabo choke)
|Midwest Cage Championship 53
|
|align=center|1
|align=center|2:36
|Des Moines, Iowa, United States
|
|-
|Loss
|align=center|4–1
|Emmanuel Sanchez
|Decision (unanimous)
|RFA 10: Rhodes vs. Jouban
|
|align=center|3
|align=center|5:00
|Des Moines, Iowa, United States
|
|-
|Win
|align=center|4–0
|Doug Jenkins
|Submission (arm-triangle choke)
|Midwest Cage Championship 48
|
|align=center|2
|align=center|3:19
|Des Moines, Iowa, United States
|
|-
|Win
|align=center|3–0
|Matt Rider
|Submission (rear-naked choke)
|Midwest Cage Championship 46
|
|align=center|1
|align=center|1:35
|Des Moines, Iowa, United States
|
|-
|Win
|align=center|2–0
|Nick Walker
|Submission (rear-naked choke)
|MCC 44: Thanksgiving Throwdown
|
|align=center|1
|align=center|1:33
|Des Moines, Iowa, United States
|
|-
|Win
|align=center|1–0
| Prentiss Wolf
|Submission (triangle choke)
|MCC 42: Lund vs. Schmauss
|
|align=center|1
|align=center|2:04
|Des Moines, Iowa, United States
|

References

External links
 
 

1983 births
Living people
American male mixed martial artists
People from Webster City, Iowa
Mixed martial artists from Iowa
Lightweight mixed martial artists
Ultimate Fighting Championship male fighters